Luis Fernando López Figueroa (born 26 January 1992) is a Mexican footballer who plays as a midfielder. He is currently a free agent.

Career 
Necaxa were López's first club, he featured for their youth academy for a number of years prior to making the jump into first-team football. In 2009, López was loaned to Inter de Tehuacán of Serie B. He made his debut on 6 September against Gallos Blancos, prior to scoring his first goal three appearances later versus Estudiantes Tecos. In total, he made thirty-three appearances and scored eleven goals for Inter de Tehuacán. 2010 saw López join Cruz Azul on loan for two seasons, though he subsequently only featured for the club's U20 team. He returned to Necaxa for the 2012–13 Ascenso MX season.

He made his professional football bow on 1 September 2012 versus Cachorros U. de G. He stayed with Necaxa for two further years, scoring eight times in forty-three fixtures in all competitions. He left the club in 2014 and had subsequent spells with Cimarrones de Sonora and Santos de Soledad between 2014 and 2016. Ahead of the 2016–17 campaign, López joined Tercera División de México side AEM. One goal in twelve appearances followed.

Career statistics 
.

References

External links 

1992 births
Living people
Footballers from Sinaloa
Mexican footballers
Association football midfielders
Liga MX players
Ascenso MX players
Liga Premier de México players
Tercera División de México players
Club Necaxa footballers
Cruz Azul footballers
Cimarrones de Sonora players
Santos de Soledad players
Atlético Estado de México players